Andrew Norman is a Papua New Guinean rugby league footballer and coach who represented Papua New Guinea in the 2000 World Cup.

References

Living people
Papua New Guinean rugby league players
Papua New Guinean sportsmen
Papua New Guinea national rugby league team players
1972 births
Place of birth missing (living people)